Franglen is a surname. Notable people with the surname include:
 Nick Franglen (born 1965), British musician, record producer and installation artist
 Simon Franglen (born 1963), British composer, record producer, arrangeur and musician